DS:Style is a series of educational software products for the Nintendo DS console. The series was created and published in Japan exclusively by Square Enix, a Japanese video game developer and publisher, and developed by both Square Enix and several other companies. It includes reference guides, travel guides for different countries or cities, and study guides for Japanese professional licensing and civil servant exams. The motto for the series is "The fun of games, the joy of learning". Despite the motto and being sold for a game console, the products actually include almost no gaming elements, instead functioning as reference guides and knowledge quizzes. The series was perceived when it launched as an attempt by Square Enix to break into a new market, that of "non-traditional gamers". All the games that got a TV commercial were endorsed by Hitomi Kaikawa.

The first nine products in the series were announced on April 4, 2007 and the first five were released on July 5, 2007; the last DS:Style release was on February 3, 2011. Several of the products were named after other non-software products, such as the Lonely Planet series of travel guides, the Japanese Legal Mind (LEC) test preparatory company, or the Japanese Tipness yoga studio chain. While not a part of the DS:Style series, bookkeeping and real estate certification products (Honki de Manabu: LEC de Goukaku - DS Hishou Boki 3-Kyū and Honki de Manabu: LEC de Goukaku - DS Takuchi Tatemono Torihiki Shuninsha) were also released on the PlayStation Portable in 2010.

The releases, as they fell in the line between games and software products, went largely unreviewed. Prior to release, the initial products were regarded as having "potential". Critics' reactions to the series were tepid; they felt that the products would sell well, given the publisher and subject matter, but that there was little interesting about them. They felt that it would not be worth localizing the products to sell in non-Japanese markets, as there was not much of a market for non-game software for the Nintendo DS without heavy advertising, due to prior failures in promoting such products.

List of products

References

External links
 DS Style official site 

Educational video games
Japan-exclusive video games
Nintendo DS games
Nintendo DS-only games
Square Enix franchises
Square Enix games
Lists of video games by franchise
Video games developed in Japan